is a Japanese professional footballer who plays as a defender for Philippines Football League club Stallion Laguna.

Career
Yamagata started his career in the Japanese lower divisions with SP Kyoto and Sagamihara. He soon moved to Cambodia, where he played for Build Bright United. He also played in Laos for Lanexang United.

On 31 December 2015, it was announced that Yamagata had signed with Indian I-League side, Shillong Lajong. He made his debut for the club on 28 January 2016 against Salgaocar. He played the full match as Shillong Lajong won 1–0.

Indian statistics

References

1986 births
Living people
Japanese footballers
Shillong Lajong FC players
Association football defenders
Expatriate footballers in Cambodia
I-League players
Expatriate footballers in India
Japanese expatriate sportspeople in India
Japanese expatriate footballers
Stallion Laguna F.C. players
Japanese expatriate sportspeople in Cambodia